Redcap is a British television series produced by ABC Weekend TV and broadcast on the ITV network.

It starred John Thaw as Sergeant John Mann, a member of the Special Investigation Branch of the Royal Military Police and ran for two series and 26 episodes between 1964 and 1966. Other actors appearing in the series included Kenneth Colley, Keith Barron, Windsor Davies, David Battley, Allan Cuthbertson and Barry Letts. The series was created by Jack Bell and was written by Roger Marshall, Troy Kennedy-Martin, Jeremy Paul, Robert Holles and Richard Harris, among others.

Of the run, 23 of the 26 episodes still exist in their complete form (the missing/incomplete episodes are indicated below).

Episodes

Season 1

Season 2

References

External links
 

1960s British drama television series
1964 British television series debuts
1966 British television series endings
Television shows produced by ABC Weekend TV
ITV television dramas
British military television series
Adjutant General's Corps
English-language television shows
1960s British crime television series